Richard Ernest Lowe (13 July 1915 – 1986) was an English footballer who played for Sheffield United and Hull City in the Football League. He had a wife (Vera) and three daughters and one son (Linda, Val, Sandra and Richard).

References

1915 births
1986 deaths
English footballers
Association football forwards
Leeds United F.C. players
Sheffield United F.C. players
Hull City A.F.C. players
English Football League players
People from Cannock